Pearley F. Johnson (January 1, 1905 – December 19, 1991), nicknamed "Tubby", was an American Negro league outfielder between 1926 and 1933.

A native of La Plata, Maryland, Johnson made his Negro leagues debut in 1926 with the Baltimore Black Sox. He played for Baltimore the following season, and went on to play for the Harrisburg Giants in 1928 before finishing his career back in Baltimore in 1933. Johnson died in Boston, Massachusetts in 1991 at age 86.

References

External links
 and Seamheads

1905 births
1991 deaths
Baltimore Black Sox players
Harrisburg Giants players
Baseball outfielders
Baseball players from Maryland
People from La Plata, Maryland
20th-century African-American sportspeople